The 1978 Tasmanian Australian National Football League (TANFL) premiership season was an Australian rules football competition staged in Hobart, Tasmania over twenty (20) roster rounds and four (4) finals series matches between 1 April and 16 September 1978. 
The competition's major sponsor for the 1978 season was Hitachi.

Participating Clubs
Clarence District Football Club
Glenorchy District Football Club
Hobart Football Club
New Norfolk District Football Club
North Hobart Football Club
Sandy Bay Football Club

1978 TANFL Club Coaches
Eric Pascoe (Clarence)
Jack Rough (Glenorchy)
Mal Pascoe (Hobart)
Peter Chisnall (New Norfolk)
Ian Bremner (North Hobart)
Paul Sproule (Sandy Bay)

TANFL Reserves Grand Final
Nth Hobart 12.20 (92) v Glenorchy 11.13 (79) – North Hobart Oval

TANFL Under-19's Grand Final
Nth Hobart 20.13 (133) v Clarence 11.16 (82) – North Hobart Oval

TANFL Under-17's Grand Final
Nth Hobart 15.10 (100) v Glenorchy 8.8 (56) – New Town Oval.

State Preliminary Final
(Saturday, 23 September 1978)
Sandy Bay: 7.5 (47) | 7.6 (48) | 14.11 (95) | 20.17 (137)
Nth Launceston: 1.0 (6) | 7.3 (45) | 8.6 (54) | 11.7 (73)
Attendance: 4,425 at North Hobart Oval

State Grand Final
(Sunday, 1 October 1978)
Cooee: 5.6 (36) | 8.12 (60) | 13.19 (97) | 19.25 (139)
Sandy Bay: 2.4 (16) | 6.8 (44) | 9.16 (70) | 16.17 (113)
Attendance: 3,860 at West Park Oval

Interstate Matches
Interstate Match (Tuesday, 25 April 1978)
ACT 17.7 (109) v Tasmania 16.9 (105) – Att: N/A at Manuka Oval, Canberra

Interstate Match (Sunday, 7 May 1978)
Queensland 16.9 (105) v Tasmania 12.11 (83) – Att: 10,000 at the Gabba, Brisbane

Interstate Match (Saturday, 10 June 1978)
Victoria 25.11 (161) v Tasmania 18.6 (114) – Att: 17,119 at North Hobart Oval *
Note: Includes 343 pre-sold family pass tickets.

Intrastate Matches
Jubilee Shield (Saturday, 29 April 1978)
TANFL 19.8 (122) v NTFA 13.13 (91) – Att: N/A at York Park

Jubilee Shield (Saturday, 13 May 1978)
TANFL 15.17 (107) v NWFU 15.11 (101) – Att: 5,691 at North Hobart Oval

Leading Goalkickers: TANFL
Peter Hudson (Glenorchy) – 153
Michael Elliot (Sandy Bay) – 106
Bob Smith (Nth Hobart) – 88
Paul Courto (Hobart) – 78

Medal Winners
Peter Hudson (Glenorchy) – William Leitch Medal
Henry Pastoor (Sandy Bay) – George Watt Medal (Reserves)
Jamie McIntyre (Hobart) – V.A Geard Medal (Under-19's)
Tim Carter (Clarence) & Jamie Woolley (Glenorchy) – D.R Plaister Medal (Under-17's)
Robbie Dykes (Glenorchy) – Weller Arnold Medal (Best player in Interstate Match)

1978 TANFL Ladder

Round 1
(Saturday, 1 April 1978)
Nth Hobart 17.10 (112) v Clarence 10.16 (76) – Att: 3,174 at North Hobart Oval
Glenorchy 20.10 (130) v Hobart 11.15 (81) – Att: 2,379 at KGV Football Park
Sandy Bay 16.14 (110) v New Norfolk 8.12 (60) – Att: 1,922 at Boyer Oval

Round 2
(Saturday, 8 April 1978)
Glenorchy 14.14 (98) v New Norfolk 11.16 (82) – Att: 3,281 at North Hobart Oval
Sandy Bay 19.28 (142) v Nth Hobart 4.6 (30) – Att: 2,512 at Queenborough Oval
Hobart 12.11 (83) v Clarence 9.10 (64) – Att: 1,880 at Bellerive Oval

Round 3
(Saturday, 15 April 1978)
Nth Hobart 15.10 (100) v Glenorchy 15.8 (98) – Att: 4,249 at North Hobart Oval
New Norfolk 16.15 (111) v Hobart 15.14 (104) – Att: 1,377 at TCA Ground
Sandy Bay 15.12 (102) v Clarence 7.13 (55) – Att: 1,307 at KGV Football Park

Round 4
(Saturday, 22 April. Sunday, 23 April & Tuesday, 25 April 1978)
Glenorchy 21.17 (143) v Clarence 13.15 (93) – Att: 4,138 at North Hobart Oval (Saturday)
New Norfolk 16.20 (116) v Nth Hobart 9.16 (70) – Att: 2,757 at Boyer Oval (Sunday)
Hobart 11.19 (85) v Sandy Bay 11.11 (77) – Att: 2,864 at North Hobart Oval (Tuesday)

Round 5
(Saturday, 29 April 1978)
Nth Hobart 19.14 (128) v Hobart 9.10 (64) – Att: 2,680 at North Hobart Oval
Sandy Bay 15.12 (102) v Glenorchy 7.17 (59) – Att: 1,898 at Queenborough Oval
Clarence 15.11 (101) v New Norfolk 11.16 (82) – Att: 1,253 at KGV Football Park

Round 6
(Saturday, 6 May 1978)
Glenorchy 20.19 (139) v Hobart 10.12 (72) – Att: 2,754 at North Hobart Oval
Sandy Bay 16.16 (112) v New Norfolk 11.19 (85) – Att: 1,421 at Queenborough Oval
Clarence 14.13 (97) v Nth Hobart 12.15 (87) – Att: 1,922 at Bellerive Oval

Round 7
(Saturday, 20 May 1978)
Nth Hobart 17.11 (113) v Sandy Bay 13.14 (92) – Att: 1,416 at North Hobart Oval
Clarence 16.12 (108) v Hobart 15.6 (96) – Att: 1,397 at TCA Ground *
New Norfolk 17.14 (116) v Glenorchy 13.15 (93) – Att: 2,333 at KGV Football Park
Note: Clarence captain-coach Eric Pascoe controversially calls for a head-count during the final quarter in order to stop Hobart's momentum.

Round 8
(Saturday, 27 May & Sunday, 28 May 1978)
Sandy Bay 15.21 (111) v Clarence 4.11 (35) – Att: 2,915 at North Hobart Oval
New Norfolk 18.19 (127) v Hobart 16.12 (108) – Att: 1,249 at Boyer Oval
Glenorchy 15.13 (103) v Nth Hobart 6.5 (41) – Att: 4,147 at North Hobart Oval (Sunday)

Round 9
(Saturday, 3 June & Monday, 5 June 1978)
New Norfolk 15.15 (105) v Nth Hobart 9.10 (64) – Att: 2,598 at North Hobart Oval
Sandy Bay 17.12 (114) v Hobart 5.7 (37) – Att: 1,018 at KGV Football Park
Glenorchy 11.12 (78) v Clarence 7.7 (49) – Att: 2,556 at North Hobart Oval (Monday)

Round 10
(Saturday, 17 June & Sunday, 18 June 1978)
Clarence 12.10 (82) v New Norfolk 7.14 (56) – Att: 1,847 at North Hobart Oval
Nth Hobart 19.11 (125) v Hobart 9.9 (63) – Att: 1,291 at TCA Ground
Sandy Bay 13.7 (85) v Glenorchy 12.10 (82) – Att: 3,382 at KGV Football Park (Sunday)

Round 11
(Saturday, 24 June 1978)
Clarence 9.3 (57) v Nth Hobart 6.9 (45) – Att: 2,159 at North Hobart Oval
Glenorchy 16.20 (116) v Hobart 4.8 (32) – Att: 1,216 at TCA Ground
New Norfolk 11.13 (79) v Sandy Bay 6.15 (51) – Att: 1,100 at KGV Football Park

Round 12
(Saturday, 1 July 1978)
Hobart 14.19 (103) v Clarence 11.16 (82) – Att: 1,450 at TCA Ground
Sandy Bay 22.15 (147) v Nth Hobart 5.8 (38) – Att: 1,630 at Queenborough Oval
Glenorchy 15.12 (102) v New Norfolk 12.9 (81) – Att: 2,033 at Boyer Oval

Round 13
(Saturday, 8 July 1978)
Glenorchy 19.15 (129) v Nth Hobart 14.12 (96) – Att: 2,167 at North Hobart Oval
Sandy Bay 12.23 (95) v Clarence 5.16 (46) – Att: 1,508 at Bellerive Oval
Hobart 13.13 (91) v New Norfolk 12.15 (87) – Att: 935 at Boyer Oval

Round 14
(Saturday, 15 July 1978)
Sandy Bay 16.15 (111) v Hobart 10.9 (69) – Att: 1,289 at TCA Ground
Glenorchy 17.14 (116) v Clarence 9.15 (69) – Att: 2,306 at KGV Football Park
Nth Hobart 16.13 (109) v New Norfolk 9.12 (66) – Att: 1,400 at Boyer Oval

Round 15
(Saturday, 22 July & Sunday, 23 July 1978)
Nth Hobart 23.11 (149) v Hobart 9.12 (66) – Att: 2,124 at North Hobart Oval
Sandy Bay 14.12 (96) v Glenorchy 10.11 (71) – Att: 2,790 at Queenborough Oval
New Norfolk 14.18 (102) v Clarence 10.11 (71) – Att: 1,978 at Bellerive Oval (Sunday)

Round 16
(Saturday, 29 July 1978)
Sandy Bay 22.14 (146) v New Norfolk 9.15 (69) – Att: 1,936 at North Hobart Oval
Glenorchy 19.13 (127) v Hobart 14.14 (98) – Att: 1,483 at TCA Ground
Clarence 13.26 (104) v Nth Hobart 15.12 (102) – Att: 1,803 at Bellerive Oval

Round 17
(Saturday, 5 August & Sunday, 6 August 1978)
Nth Hobart 12.12 (84) v Sandy Bay 10.13 (73) – Att: 6,542 at North Hobart Oval
Glenorchy 20.14 (134) v New Norfolk 13.12 (90) – Att: 1,860 at Boyer Oval
Hobart 13.10 (88) v Clarence 8.15 (63) – Att: 1,670 at KGV Football Park (Sunday)

Round 18
(Saturday, 12 August 1978)
Hobart 13.10 (88) v New Norfolk 11.21 (87) – Att: 1,155 at North Hobart Oval
Sandy Bay 23.17 (155) v Clarence 9.11 (65) – Att: 1,114 at Queenborough Oval
Glenorchy 14.17 (101) v Nth Hobart 14.12 (96) – Att: 2,510 at KGV Football Park

Round 19
(Saturday, 19 August 1978)
New Norfolk 17.11 (113) v Nth Hobart 13.13 (91) – Att: 2,566 at North Hobart Oval
Sandy Bay 21.18 (144) v Hobart 9.7 (61) – Att: 1,168 at Queenborough Oval
Glenorchy 19.15 (129) v Clarence 9.10 (64) – Att: 1,715 at Bellerive Oval

Round 20
(Saturday, 26 August 1978)
Sandy Bay 13.14 (92) v Glenorchy 3.6 (24) – Att: 2,601 at North Hobart Oval *
Nth Hobart 8.13 (61) v Hobart 7.10 (52) – Att: 828 at TCA Ground
New Norfolk 14.17 (101) v Clarence 11.11 (77) – Att: 837 at Boyer Oval *
Note: Peter Hudson held goalless for the only time in his TFL career and Clarence wear their traditional Maroon and white V playing jumper for the final time.

First Semi Final
(Saturday, 2 September 1978)
New Norfolk: 6.5 (41) | 11.7 (73) | 17.10 (112) | 20.14 (134)
Nth Hobart: 3.3 (21) | 10.9 (69) | 15.16 (106) | 16.19 (115)
Attendance: 6,489 at North Hobart Oval

Second Semi Final
(Sunday, 3 September 1978)
Glenorchy: 4.4 (28) | 8.6 (54) | 16.11 (107) | 18.13 (121)
Sandy Bay: 3.6 (24) | 6.10 (46) | 10.11 (71) | 11.15 (81)
Attendance: 6,564 at North Hobart Oval

Preliminary Final
(Saturday, 9 September 1978)
Sandy Bay: 2.2 (14) | 7.5 (47) | 9.9 (63) | 16.11 (107)
New Norfolk: 1.3 (9) | 1.3 (9) | 3.7 (25) | 6.12 (48)
Attendance: 9,145 at North Hobart Oval

Grand Final
(Saturday, 16 September 1978)
Sandy Bay: 3.4 (22) | 7.6 (48) | 9.10 (64) | 11.14 (80)
Glenorchy: 3.4 (22) | 5.8 (38) | 7.10 (52) | 9.15 (69)
Attendance: 18,662 at North Hobart Oval

Source: All scores and statistics courtesy of the Hobart Mercury, Saturday Evening Mercury (SEM) and North West Advocate publications.

Tasmanian Football League seasons